Johann Christoph Wendland (July 17, 1755 – July 27, 1828) was a German botanist and gardener born in Petit-Landau, Alsace.

Family
His son, Heinrich Ludolph Wendland (1791–1869), and his grandson, Hermann Wendland (1825–1903), were also gardeners and botanists.

Youth
As a young man he received an education in horticulture at the nursery of Karlsruhe Palace. In 1780 he became a gardener at Herrenhausen Gardens in Hanover, where he gained botanical experience from Jakob Friedrich Ehrhart (1742–1795), the director of the gardens.

Life work
In 1817 Wendland was appointed inspector at Herrenhausen Gardens. He specialized in the culture of vineyards and peach trees. He created the illustrations for his published works. As a taxonomist, he circumscribed numerous plant genera and species.

Selected publications 
 Hortus Herrenhusanus, 1788-1801 
 Verzeichnis der Glas- und Treibhauspflanzen des Königlichen Berggartens zu Herrenhausen (List of glass and greenhouse plants of the Herrenhausen Gardens), 1797 
 Botanische Beobachtungen nebst einigen neuen Gattungen und Arten (Botanical observations, including some new genera and species), 1798 
 Ericarum icones et descriptiones; (26 issues)- 1798-1823   
 Collectio plantarum tam exoticarum quam indigenarum; (three volumes until 1819).

References 

 This article is based on a translation of text from an equivalent article at the German Wikipedia.

1755 births
1828 deaths
People from Haut-Rhin
19th-century German botanists
German gardeners
18th-century German botanists